Archbishop Ezekiel Tsoukalas (13 May 1913 – 1 July 1987) was a Greek bishop and the first Archbishop of Australia in the Greek Orthodox Archdiocese of Australia.

Archbishop Ezekiel was an assistant bishop in the Greek Orthodox Archdiocese of America from 1950 to 1959. He had served as a bishop in Boston and Chicago. He had been assistant director of Holy Cross Greek Orthodox School of Theology in Brookline, Massachusetts, in 1943 and became director in 1949.

Archbishop of Australia
Archbishop Ezekiel was elected the fourth Metropolitan of Australia and New Zealand in February 1959. He replaced Metropolitan Theophylactos Papathanasopoulos, the third metropolitan, who was killed in a car crash in 1958. On 1 September 1959, the Metropolis of Australia and New Zealand was elevated to an Archdiocese and Metropolitan Ezekiel was elevated to Archbishop. In 1970 the Metropolis of New Zealand was created, so Archbishop Ezekiel became the Archbishop of Australia.

In August 1974, the Ecumenical Patriarchate promoted Archbishop Ezekiel to the Metropolis of Pisidia where he remained until 1987. He died in Athens in July 1987.

On 3 February 1975, the Holy Synod of the Ecumenical Patriarchate unanimously elected the Metropolitan of Miletoupolis, Archbishop Stylianos, a lecturer at the University of Thessaloniki, as the new Archbishop of Australia.

References

1913 births
People from Brookline, Massachusetts
Eastern Orthodox archbishops in Australia
Australian people of Greek descent
Greek Orthodox bishops of Boston
1987 deaths
20th-century Eastern Orthodox archbishops
Greek expatriate bishops